Bae Sang-hee (born 1 February 1992) is a South Korean sport shooter.

She participated at the 2018 ISSF World Shooting Championships, winning a medal.

References

External links

Living people
1992 births
South Korean female sport shooters
ISSF rifle shooters
Shooters at the 2018 Asian Games
Asian Games competitors for South Korea
Shooters at the 2020 Summer Olympics
21st-century South Korean women